The 2011–12 GET-ligaen was the 73rd season of Norway's premier ice hockey league, Eliteserien (known as GET-ligaen for sponsorship reasons).

The season began on 10 September 2011 with the final round of the regular season played on 1 March 2012. The Stavanger Oilers won their first league championship after beating Frisk Asker on 2 February 2012. With a total of 112 points, the Oilers broke the previous record of 108 points held by the Sparta Warriors (2011) and Storhamar Dragons (2006). Lørenskog finished as runners-up ahead of Vålerenga.

The playoffs to determine the 2012 Norwegian champions began on 4 March 2012 and ended on 13 April 2012. Stavanger defeated Lørenskog by 4 games to 2 in the finals to claim their second Norwegian Championship title in three seasons. The playoffs were contested by the top eight teams in the regular season.

Qualification for the final two berths in the 2012–13 GET-ligaen was held between 8 March and 24 March 2012. The Tønsberg Vikings won the tournament and gained promotion to the GET-ligaen for the first time in the team's history. Frisk Asker secured the runner-up spot and continued play at the top level; Manglerud Star was relegated to the 1. divisjon.

Overall attendance surpassed 400,000 for the first time in league history.

Regular season

Final standings
Source: pointstreak.com

Scoring leaders
These were the top ten skaters based on points. If the list exceeds ten skaters because of a tie in points, all of the tied skaters are shown.

Leading goaltenders
These were the top five goaltenders based on goals against average.

Attendance

Source:pointstreak.com

Playoffs
After the regular season, the standard of eight teams qualified for the playoffs. In the first and second rounds, the highest remaining seed chooses which of the two lowest remaining seeds to be matched against. In each round the higher-seeded team is awarded home ice advantage. Each best-of-seven series follows a 1–1–1–1–1–1–1 format: the higher-seeded team plays at home for games 1 and 3 (plus 5 and 7 if necessary), and the lower-seeded team at home for games 2, 4 and 6 (if necessary).

Bracket

Source: pointstreak.com

Game log

|(1) Stavanger Oilers vs. (8) Rosenborg

Stavanger won series 4–0

(2) Lørenskog vs. (7) Stjernen

Lørenskog won series 4–0

(3) Vålerenga vs. (6) Storhamar Dragons

Vålerenga won series 4–3

(4) Lillehammer vs. (5) Sparta Warriors

Lillehammer won series 4–3
|-

|(1) Stavanger Oilers vs. (4) Lillehammer

Stavanger won series 4–0

(2) Lørenskog vs. (3) Vålerenga

Lørenskog won series 4–2
|-

|(1) Stavanger Oilers vs. (2) Lørenskog

Stavanger won series 4–2

Scoring leaders
These were the top ten skaters in the playoffs based on points. If the list exceeds ten skaters because of a tie in points, all of the tied skaters are shown.

Leading goaltenders
These were the top five goaltenders in the playoffs based on goals against average.

Qualification
After the regular season had ended, the two lowest ranked teams in the league and the two highest ranked teams in the 1. divisjon competed for the right to play in the 2012–13 GET-ligaen. Comet, Frisk Asker, Manglerud Star and the Tønsberg Vikings took part. The tournament was played from 8 March to 24 March 2012 and was organized according to a double round robin format: each club played the others twice, home and away, for a total of six games. The points system and ranking method used were the same as in the GET-ligaen.

Tønsberg won five out of six games, securing promotion in the penultimate round by defeating Frisk Asker 4–3 on penalties. Frisk Asker eventually finished in second place by gaining a 1–0 win in regular time against Manglerud Star in the final round. This meant that the latter team was relegated to the 1. divisjon after three consecutive seasons in the top flight. Comet lost all its games and finished last.

Final standings
Source: hockey.no

Game log

|Round 1

Round 2

Round 3

Round 4

Round 5

Round 6

Awards
All-Star team

The following players were selected to the 2011–12 GET-ligaen All-Star team:
Goaltender: Tommy Johansen (Storhamar)
Defenseman: Patrick Coulombe (Vålerenga)
Defenseman: Tim Kunes (Stavanger)
Center: Mats Frøshaug (Lørenskog)
Winger: James Sixsmith (Lørenskog)
Winger: Ryan MacMurchy (Stavanger)

Other
Player of the year: Ryan MacMurchy (Stavanger)
Coach of the year: David Livingston (Lørenskog)
Playoff MVP: Lars-Peder Nagel (Stavanger)

References

External links
  

2011–12
Norway
GET-ligaen